Belette, weasel in French, may refer to:
 HMS Belette (disambiguation)
 La Belette (disambiguation)